White eyebrows may refer to:
 As the fables and phrases, it means that White eyebrows is the greatest one among others.
 Ma Liang (馬良), an advisor to the powerful warlord Liu Bei during the Three Kingdoms era of China.
 Bak Mei (白眉), one of the legendary Five Elders of China.
 Pai Mei, a character who is in the Hollywood film Kill Bill.